26/11-L is a village  in Chichawatni, Pakistan.

Populated places in Sahiwal District